William E. "Kip" Ward (born June 3, 1949) is a retired United States Army three-star general who served as the inaugural Commander of United States Africa Command from October 1, 2007 to March 8, 2011. During his long career in public service, he has taught international affairs and relations at West Point, US Military Academy; served as Commander of Stabilization Force, Operation Joint Forge, Sarajevo, Bosnia; was appointed the Secretary of State's Security Coordinator to the Israel - Palestinian Authority; Deputy Commander, Headquarters US European Command, Stuttgart, Germany; and many other progressively responsible assignments. He later retired and served as President and chief operating officer of the logistics, IT, and engineering business, Vectrus (fka SENTEL).

Education
Ward holds a Master of Arts degree in Political Science from Pennsylvania State University and a Bachelor of Arts degree in Political Science from Morgan State University. While at Morgan State, he was a member of the National Society of Pershing Rifles. Over the course of his military service, he received military education at the Infantry Officer Basic and Advanced courses, US Army Command and General Staff College, and US Army War College.

Career
Ward began his military career as a commissioned infantry officer in June 1971. His command and troop assignments include in chronological order: Platoon Leader, 3d Battalion (Airborne), 325th Infantry, 82d Airborne Division, Fort Bragg, North Carolina; Rifle Company Commander, 1st Battalion (Mechanized), 17th Infantry, 2d Infantry Division, Camp Howze, Korea; S-4 (Logistics), 210th Field Artillery Brigade, VII Corps, US Army Europe and Seventh Army, Germany; Executive Officer, 1st Battalion (Mechanized), 7th Infantry, 3d Infantry Division, US Army Europe and Seventh Army, Germany; Commander, 5th Battalion, 9th Infantry, 2d Brigade, later G-4 (Logistics), 6th Infantry Division (Light), Fort Wainwright, Alaska; Commander, 2d Brigade, 10th Mountain Division (Light), Fort Drum, New York and Operation Restore Hope, Mogadishu, Somalia; Assistant Division Commander (Support), 82d Airborne Division, Fort Bragg, North Carolina; Commanding General 25th Infantry Division (Light) and US Army, Hawaii, Schofield Barracks, Hawaii; and Commander, Stabilization Force, Operation Joint Forge, Sarajevo, Bosnia.

His staff assignments include: Executive Officer, US Army Military Community Activity—Aschaffenburg, US Army Europe and Seventh Army, Germany; Staff Officer (Logistics), Office of the Deputy Chief of Staff for Logistics, US Army, Washington, DC; Executive Officer to the Vice Chief of Staff, US Army, Washington, DC; Deputy Director for Operations, J-3, National Military Command Center, The Joint Staff, Washington, DC; Chief, Office of Military Cooperation, Egypt, American Embassy, Egypt; and Vice Director for Operations, J-3, The Joint Staff, Washington, DC.

Prior to assuming command at U.S. Africa Command, Ward was Deputy Commander, US European Command, Stuttgart, Germany. He previously served as the Deputy Commanding General/Chief of Staff, US Army Europe and Seventh Army. While in this capacity he was selected by the Secretary of State to serve as the United States Security Coordinator, Israel - Palestinian Authority where he served from March through December 2005.

General Ward's awards and badges include: the Defense Distinguished Service Medal (with Oak Leaf Cluster); the Distinguished Service Medal; the Defense Superior Service Medal (with two Oak Leaf Clusters); the Legion of Merit (with three Oak Leaf Clusters); the Defense Meritorious Service Medal; the Meritorious Service Medal (with six Oak Leaf Clusters); the Joint Service Commendation Medal; the Army Commendation Medal (with three Oak Leaf Clusters); the Army Achievement Medal (with Oak Leaf Cluster); the Expert Infantryman's Badge; the Combat Infantryman's Badge; and the Master Parachutist Badge.

After he left U.S. Africa Command, Ward retired at the rank of Lieutenant General in November, 2012.  He relinquished command of Africa Command to General Carter F. Ham. Before he retired, Ward received the rank of major general and served as a special assistant to the army's Vice Chief of Staff during which an investigation was conducted on his use of official funds. While an official retirement ceremony was held in April 2011, Ward remained on active duty pending a special Army investigation by the Office of the Inspector General, U.S. Department of Defense. The investigation ran 17 months and ended with a ruling by Defense Secretary Leon Panetta.  He was not found as being derelict in his duties or for improper performance, but for keeping poor official records of his travel expenses, for unnecessarily extending official trips for personal reasons, and allowing his wife to travel on military aircraft without sufficient justification. Ward then retired with the rank of lieutenant general in November 2012, which was determined to be the last rank in which he had satisfactorily served.

Career highlights
 2002: Commander, NATO Stabilisation Force, Operation Joint Forge, Bosnia and Herzegovina.
 2003: Deputy Commander, United States Army Europe.
 2005: Special Envoy to Israel and Palestine — working specifically to help reform the security services of the Palestinian authority — under George W. Bush and Condoleezza Rice.
 2007: Named inaugural commander of United States Africa Command (AFRICOM) by President George W. Bush. Chief of the Office of Military Cooperation at the U.S. Embassy in Cairo.

Post-military
Since retiring, Ward has served as President and chief operating officer of the logistics, IT, and engineering business, Vectrus (fka SENTEL).

Ward continues to engage the strategy and policy community on matters of global security, including his participation in the Atlantic Council's 2018 Roundtable on security in Mali and ongoing discussions on the role of diplomacy in global stability, including the American Academy of Diplomacy's podcast series, “The General and the Ambassador". He also speaks to student groups on issues surrounding peace and global security and leadership.

Ward also serves on the Advisory Board of Redwood Global, an infrastructure, energy and investment firm.

Awards and decorations
Ward received the following awards and decorations:

William E. Ward received the Trumpet Award in 2010 as well as the BEYA award for Lifetime Achievement.

Notable memberships 
 100 Black Men of America
 Omega Psi Phi
 Sigma Pi Phi
 The National Society of Pershing Rifles

References

External links

 
 

United States Army generals
Recipients of the Legion of Merit
African-American United States Army personnel
Pennsylvania State University alumni
Pershing Riflemen
Morgan State University alumni
United States Army Command and General Staff College alumni
Living people
Recipients of the Defense Superior Service Medal
Recipients of the Defense Distinguished Service Medal
Recipients of the Distinguished Service Medal (US Army)
1949 births
21st-century African-American people
20th-century African-American people